The Dammbach is a river in Saxony-Anhalt and Thuringia, Germany. It is a right tributary of the Rappbode in Trautenstein.

See also
List of rivers of Saxony-Anhalt
List of rivers of Thuringia

References

Rivers of Saxony-Anhalt
Rivers of Thuringia
Rivers of Germany